Pedro Miguel Alves Mendes (born 16 April 1990) is a Portuguese professional footballer who plays for Porto D'Ave as a left winger.

Club career
Born in Guimarães, Mendes played youth football for four different clubs, including two spells with local Vitória Sport Clube. He made his senior debut in 2009 with Gondomar S.C. in the third level and, after two seasons, signed with Cypriot Second Division team Doxa Katokopias FC.

In the summer of 2012, Mendes joined PSFC Chernomorets Burgas. His input for the Bulgarians consisted of 22 minutes in a 1–3 away loss against PFC Lokomotiv Sofia for the Bulgarian Cup, and he was released at the end of the campaign.

In the following years, Mendes competed in the Portuguese third tier, with F.C. Lixa and Varzim SC.

References

External links
 
 

1990 births
Living people
Sportspeople from Guimarães
Association football wingers
Portuguese footballers
Liga Portugal 2 players
Segunda Divisão players
Gondomar S.C. players
F.C. Lixa players
Varzim S.C. players
C.D. Tondela players
F.C. Felgueiras 1932 players
AD Oliveirense players
Cypriot Second Division players
Doxa Katokopias FC players
PFC Chernomorets Burgas players
Portuguese expatriate footballers
Expatriate footballers in Cyprus
Expatriate footballers in Bulgaria
Portuguese expatriate sportspeople in Cyprus
Portuguese expatriate sportspeople in Bulgaria